Alfonso XII, was an  unprotected cruiser of the Spanish Navy.

Technical description

Alfonso XII was built by the naval shipyard at Ferrol; she and her sister ship  were the first two steel-hulled cruisers built there. She was laid down in August 1881, but shortages of materials delayed her construction and she was not launched until 21 September 1887.

She had two funnels. Her main armament was built by Hontoria and sponson-mounted. Her five torpedo tubes all were fixed; two were forward, one was on each beam, and one was aft. Although unprotected and therefore lacking armor, she had 12 watertight compartments built in a French-style cellular system to help her resist flooding. She was designed for colonial service, with an emphasis on speed and moderate armament, but in practice machinery problems made her a much slower steamer than her designers had hoped.

Operational history
Alfonso XII commissioned in 1891.  By 1897 she was anchored in Havana harbor in Cuba, serving as flagship for Admiral Vincente Manterola, but she was unable to put to sea because her boilers required a major refit, and some of her guns had been put ashore to aid in the harbor's shore-based defenses. Also participated in the operations of the First Melillan campaign between 1893 and 1894.

Amid growing tensions between the United States and Spain, the U.S. battleship  arrived in Havana harbor unexpectedly on 25 January 1898.

Maine was still there when she exploded and sank on 15 February 1898. The crew of Alfonso XII was heavily involved in rescuing the battleship's survivors, treating them in the cruiser's sick bay, and guarding the battleship's wreck, and marched in the funeral cortege during services ashore in Havana for the men who had died aboard Maine.

With war approaching, Alfonso XII put more of her guns ashore to reinforce the coastal batteries of the Torreón de la Chorrera, and these guns did fire on American ships occasionally after the Spanish–American War broke out in April 1898. But Alfonso XII herself, immobilized in a harbor that played little part in the war, could contribute nothing else to the Spanish war effort.

After the war ended in August 1898, Alfonso XII returned to Spain, where she was decommissioned in 1900. She was sold in 1907.

Notes

References

Chesneau, Roger, and Eugene M. Kolesnik, Eds. Conway's All The World's Fighting Ships 1860–1905. New York, New York: Mayflower Books Inc., 1979. .
Gray, Randal, Ed. Conway's All The World's Fighting Ships 1906–1921. Annapolis, Maryland:Naval Institute Press, 1985. .

External links

 The Spanish–American War Centennial Website: Alfonso XII
 Department of the Navy: Naval Historical Center: Online Library of Selected Images: Spanish Navy Ships: Alfonso XII (Cruiser, 1897–1907) 

Alfonso XII-class cruisers
1887 ships
Spanish–American War cruisers of Spain
Alfonso XII of Spain
Ships built in Spain